The Portuguese Cycling Federation or UVP-FPC (in Portuguese: [União Velocipédica Portuguesa]  Federação Portuguesa de Ciclismo) is the national governing body of cycle racing in Portugal. 

It is the oldest sports federation in Portugal, created in December 14, 1899.

The UVP-FPC is a member of the Union Cycliste Internationale and the Union Européenne de Cyclisme.

External links
 Portuguese Cycling Federation official website

National members of the European Cycling Union
Cycle racing organizations
Cycling
Cycle racing in Portugal